Monteagudo is a town and municipality located in the province of Navarre, Spain. According to the 2006 census (INE), the municipality has a population of 1,146 inhabitants.

The town has an Augustinian Recollect monastery.

References

External links
 MONTEAGUDO in the Bernardo Estornés Lasa - Auñamendi Encyclopedia (Euskomedia Fundazioa) 

Municipalities in Navarre